Grębocice  is a village in Polkowice County, Lower Silesian Voivodeship, in south-western Poland. It is the seat of the administrative district (gmina) called Gmina Grębocice.

The village has a population of 1,500.

References

Villages in Polkowice County